Pandorea linearis is a species of flowering plant in the family Bignoniaceae and is endemic to Queensland.

This species was first formally described in 1901 by Frederick Manson Bailey who gave it the name Tecoma australis var. linearis in The Queensland Flora from specimens collected near Herberton by his son, John Frederick Bailey. In 2008, Gordon P. Guymer raised the variety to species status as Pandorea linearis in the journal Austrobaileya.

Pandorea linearis grows in woodland, forest and shrubland from the Stannary Hills to the Paluma Range in north-eastern Queensland.

References

linearis
Lamiales of Australia
Flora of Queensland
Taxa named by Frederick Manson Bailey
Plants described in 1845